Wesołówka  is a village in the administrative district of Gmina Siekierczyn, within Lubań County, Lower Silesian Voivodeship, in south-western Poland. 

The village has a population of 148.

References

Villages in Lubań County